Cosmin Eugen Atodiresei (born 1 March 1994) is a Romanian luger. He competed in the men's doubles event at the 2018 Winter Olympics.

References

External links
 

1994 births
Living people
Romanian male lugers
Olympic lugers of Romania
Lugers at the 2018 Winter Olympics
Lugers at the 2012 Winter Youth Olympics